Badawy Mohamed Moneim (born 11 January 1986) is an Egyptian male volleyball player. As a member of the Egypt men's national volleyball team he competed at the 2008 and 2016 Olympics and 2010 and 2014 world championships.

References

1986 births
Living people
Egyptian men's volleyball players
Place of birth missing (living people)
Volleyball players at the 2008 Summer Olympics
Volleyball players at the 2016 Summer Olympics
Olympic volleyball players of Egypt
Al Ahly (men's volleyball) players